Ryu Eun-hee (born 24 February 1990 in Incheon) is a South Korean handball player for Győri ETO KC and the South Korean national team.

Professional career

Ryu played for Busan Infrastructure Corporation in 2019. That year Busan won its first championship title in the SK Handball Korea League. Afterwards she transferred to Paris 92 and played in the French Women's Handball First League.

In November 2020, Ryu returned to Busan Infrastructure Corporation, because she was concerned about rising COVID-19 cases in France.

For the 2021/22 season she transferred to Győri ETO KC. In 2022, she won the Hungarian Championship with ETO.

National team
Ryu became the starting right back of the South Korean national team at the 2009 World Handball Championship where South Korea finished in sixth place.

Ryu was named to the team representing South Korea at the Summer Olympics held from 27 July to 12 August 2012 in London, United Kingdom. Ryu finished her first Olympic tournament ranked third overall in goals (43). Ryu and her team failed to win medals at the 2012 Olympics by losing to Spain 31–29 in double overtime in the bronze medal match. Ryu competed in the 2016 Summer Olympics held in Rio as well but her team finished disappointing 10th.

References

External links

South Korean female handball players
1990 births
Living people
Handball players at the 2012 Summer Olympics
Handball players at the 2016 Summer Olympics
Olympic handball players of South Korea
Asian Games medalists in handball
Handball players at the 2010 Asian Games
Handball players at the 2014 Asian Games
Asian Games gold medalists for South Korea
Asian Games bronze medalists for South Korea
Universiade medalists in handball
Medalists at the 2010 Asian Games
Medalists at the 2014 Asian Games
Sportspeople from Incheon
Universiade silver medalists for South Korea
Expatriate handball players
South Korean expatriate sportspeople in France
Medalists at the 2015 Summer Universiade
Handball players at the 2020 Summer Olympics
21st-century South Korean women